Sope Aluko (born July 5, 1975) is a Nigerian-born British-American actress.

Life and career
Aluko was born in Nigeria. She was raised in the United Kingdom, as her father was in the diplomatic service, which resulted in her traveling many places. Ultimately, she began attending boarding school at ten and studied in the U.K. where she grew up and earned her master's degree in Marketing. Sope had previously tried theater, but her parents did not approve of it. She traveled to America while she was on holiday and ran into her future husband "by accident". She stayed and worked in Corporate America for fifteen years. After her parents died, she decided to pursue acting again. On her background, Sope said, "When I started off in this industry...they would say, “I love your accent but…” I just didn't trust myself enough. I started going to classes to try to get rid of my accent. One day, I just said, NO because this is me. If that doesn't work then maybe I'm just not cut out for this. The minute I did that, things just changed."like it was magic

Since then, Sope has made numerous appearances on television since then including Bloodline, Law & Order: Special Victims Unit, Parks and Recreation, Burn Notice, Graceland and Army Wives. She has also acted in feature films including Identity Thief and Pitch Perfect 2.

In early 2018, Sope began gaining attention for nabbing a role in the Marvel Studios film Black Panther as a Shaman. Her casting was met with praise in her home town in Nigeria. On being in the movie Sope stated, "I had to make sure I was fit for the role because one of my scenes that was going to involve some physical activity...And then for my role, I had to speak in a different accent. I made sure I did my research about the accent...I wanted to make sure I was prepared prior to coming on set." She expressed that being in the movie was a dream come true and hoped that she could expand her acting to Nollywood. Sope later appeared in Venom, her character was given the name Dr. Rosie Collins.

In 2022, Sope was cast in the lead for a new Hulu series titled Bammas.

Personal life
Sope Aluko is married and has two sons. She is a practicing Christian.

Due to her role in Black Panther, Miami-Dade County, Florida Mayor Carlos A. Giménez has labeled April 10 as "Sope Aluko Day".

Filmography

References

External links

Living people
1975 births
Nigerian emigrants to the United Kingdom
Black British actresses